Wisconsin Territory had a non-voting delegate to the United States House of Representatives.

List of delegates representing the district 

The district was eliminated with the creation of the Minnesota Territory on March 2, 1849. However, Henry Sibley continued to serve out his term as the Delegate from the Territory of Wisconsin until March 3, 1849, making the district's effective elimination on March 3, 1849, the conclusion of the Congress.

See also
Northwest Territory's at-large congressional district
Illinois Territory's at-large congressional district
Michigan Territory's at-large congressional district
List of United States congressional districts

References 
 

Territory
Former congressional districts of the United States
At-large United States congressional districts